Vanessa Guerra (born September 14, 1989) is a Democratic politician from Michigan who represents the 95th District in the Michigan House of Representatives.

Guerra attended Bridgeport-Spaulding Schools and the University of Michigan.

Currently a law student at the University of Detroit Mercy School of Law, Guerra is the minority vice chairwoman of the House Criminal Justice Committee.

Elected at the age of 25, Guerra was the youngest member of the Michigan Legislature until the election of Jewell Jones.

References

External links
 

1989 births
Living people
Democratic Party members of the Michigan House of Representatives
Women state legislators in Michigan
University of Michigan alumni
American politicians of Mexican descent
21st-century American politicians
21st-century American women politicians
People from Saginaw, Michigan